Powhattan is a city in Brown County, Kansas, United States.  As of the 2020 census, the population of the city was 69.

History
Powhattan was founded about 1877. The city was named for the father of Pocahontas who resided in Jamestown, Virginia. It was originally a stagecoach station named Locknane.

Geography
Powhattan is located at  (39.762087, -95.633653).

Demographics

2010 census
At the 2010 census there were 77 people in 30 households, including 20 families, in the city. The racial makup of the city was 90.9% White and 9.1% Native American. Hispanic or Latino of any race were 2.6%.

Of the 30 households 33.3% had children under the age of 18 living with them, 63.3% were married couples living together, 3.3% had a female householder with no husband present, and 33.3% were non-families. 33.3% of households were one person and 23.3% were one person aged 65 or older. The average household size was 2.57 and the average family size was 3.30.

The median age was 34.8 years. 32.5% of residents were under the age of 18; 0.0% were between the ages of 18 and 24; 28.6% were from 25 to 44; 18.2% were from 45 to 64; and 20.8% were 65 or older. The gender makeup of the city was 40.3% male and 59.7% female.

2000 census
At the 2000 census there were 91 people in 41 households, including 25 families, in the city. The racial makup of the city was 90.11% White, 7.69% Native American, and 2.20% from two or more races. Hispanic or Latino of any race were 3.30%.

Of the 41 households 26.8% had children under the age of 18 living with them, 51.2% were married couples living together, 4.9% had a female householder with no husband present, and 39.0% were non-families. 36.6% of households were one person and 29.3% were one person aged 65 or older. The average household size was 2.22 and the average family size was 2.88.

The age distribution was 22.0% under the age of 18, 12.1% from 18 to 24, 18.7% from 25 to 44, 22.0% from 45 to 64, and 25.3% 65 or older. The median age was 42 years. For every 100 females, there were 82.0 males. For every 100 females age 18 and over, there were 86.8 males.

The median household income was $21,500 and the median family income  was $29,167. Males had a median income of $28,542 versus $16,250 for females. The per capita income for the city was $12,147. There were no families and 12.1% of the population living below the poverty line, including no under eighteens and none of those over 64.

Education
The community is served by South Brown County USD 430 public school district.

There is a tribal Bureau of Indian Education (BIE)-affiliated school, Kickapoo Nation School.

References

External links
 Powhattan - Directory of Public Officials
 USD 430, local school district
 Powhattan city map, KDOT

Cities in Kansas
Cities in Brown County, Kansas
1877 establishments in Kansas
Populated places established in 1877